Dragan Perović was a Yugoslavian alpine skier and sport official from Montenegro. He was best known for taking the Official's Oath at the 1984 Winter Olympics in Sarajevo.

References
IOC 1984 Winter Olympics
Wendl, Karel. "The Olympic Oath - A Brief History" Citius, Altius, Fortius (Journal of Olympic History since 1997). Winter 1995. pp. 4,5. 
Perović, Dragan–Bobi. Od Atine do Pekinga : ljetnje olimpijske igre, "Pobjeda", Podgorica, 2008, 

Living people
Year of birth missing (living people)
Yugoslav male alpine skiers
Olympic officials
Montenegrin male alpine skiers
Oath takers at the Olympic Games